Pulmonary Circulation is a peer-reviewed medical journal covering the fields of pulmonary circulation and pulmonary vascular disease. It was established in 2011 and is published by Sage Publications on behalf of the Pulmonary Vascular Research Institute, of which it is an official journal. The editors-in-chief are Jason X.-J. Yuan and Nicholas W. Morrell.

Abstracting and indexing
The journal is abstracted and indexed in BIOSIS Previews and Science Citation Index Expanded.

References

External links

English-language journals
Open access journals
Quarterly journals
University of Chicago Press academic journals
Pulmonology journals
Publications established in 2011